Semantic Technology Institute (STI) International is an association of global experts in semantics and services, located in Austria. It has members mostly from Europe, but also from South Korea, Malaysia, and Singapore.

STI International is governed by an executive board, and has a board of representatives of all members, plus several STI Fellows: Michael Brodie, Guus Schreiber, Jim Hendler, Mark Greaves, and Rudi Studer.

STI International is the organizer of several annual international conferences in semantic technologies and the future of the internet: the Extended (previously called European) Semantic Web Conference (ESWC) along with the ESWC Summer School on semantic technologies, and the Future Internet Symposium (FIS). The institute also initiates and organizes smaller events and symposia in Austria and worldwide.

The association owns a spin-off company, STI International Consulting und Research GmbH, which pursues the interests of the members in research (under the name STI Research) and in education/training (under the name Semsphere).

Members 

Voting partners:

 Free University of Amsterdam
 Free University of Bozen-Bolzano
 Freie Universität Berlin
 FZI Forschungszentrum Informatik
 German National Library of Economics
 Jozef Stefan Institute
 Know Center
 MIMOS Berhad
 Ontotext
 Saltlux Inc.
 The Open University
 TXT e-solutions
 Karlsruhe Institute of Technology, AIFB
 University of Aberdeen
 University of Innsbruck
 University of Malaga
 University of Sheffield
 Vienna University of Technology
 Wonkwang University

The network also has non-voting members that support its operations and have other benefits; the full list of members can be found at the institute's website.

References

External links 
 Homepage of STI International

Research institutes in Austria